

Gmina Wołów is an urban-rural gmina (administrative district) in Wołów County, Lower Silesian Voivodeship, in south-western Poland. It is part of the Wrocław metropolitan area.

Neighbouring gminas
Gmina Wołów is bordered by the gminas of Brzeg Dolny, Malczyce, Oborniki Śląskie, Prochowice, Prusice, Ścinawa, Środa Śląska and Wińsko.

Villages
Apart from the town of Wołów, the gmina contains the 47 villages of Biskupice, Boraszyn, Bożeń, Dębno, Domaszków, Garwół, Gliniany, Golina, Gródek, Kąty, Kłopotówka, Kretowice, Krzydlina Mała, Krzydlina Wielka, Łazarzowice, Lipnica, Łososiowice, Lubiąż, Mikorzyce, Miłcz, Moczydlnica Dworska, Mojęcice, Nieszkowice, Pawłoszewo, Pełczyn, Piotroniowice, Prawików, Proszkowa, Rataje, Rudno, Siodłkowice, Sławowice, Smarków, Stary Wołów, Stęszów, Stobno, Straszowice, Straża, Tarchalice, Uskorz Mały, Uskorz Wielki, Warzęgowo, Wodnica, Wróblewo, Wrzosy, Zagórzyce and Żychlin.

Twin towns – sister cities

Gmina Wołów is twinned with:
 Buchholz in der Nordheide, Germany
 Canteleu, France

References

Wolow
Wołów County